Inverness Athletic Football Club is a Scottish football club playing in the North Caledonian Football League currently based in the city of Inverness in the Scottish Highlands.

History 
They were formed and admitted to the North Caledonian Football Association in May 2016. In the Summer of 2017, the club were awarded the SFA Quality Mark 'Standard' award.

Ground 
The club left its short-lived home at Inverarnie Park in Farr after just a few games in the 2016–17 season and played at Pavilion Park in Muir of Ord for just over two seasons before moving to the 4G facility at Inverness Royal Academy at the beginning of 2019. Inverness Athletic returned to Muir of Ord ahead of the 2020–21 campaign.
The club then temporarily moved to Ardersier for the 2021–22 season, before relocating back to Inverness Royal Academy.

Seasons

References

External links
North Caledonian Football Association Website

External links
 Official website

Football clubs in Scotland
North Caledonian Football League teams
Association football clubs established in 2016
2016 establishments in Scotland
Football clubs in Inverness
Black Isle